Elton John's Christmas Party is a Christmas-themed compilation album from English musician Elton John. It features his 1973 Christmas single, "Step into Christmas", and a new duet with Joss Stone, "Calling It Christmas". According to John's introduction in the liner notes, as opposed to doing an album of his versions of already famous songs, he chose to do a compilation with some of his favorite holiday songs by other artists.

Release and re-release
It was initially released exclusively to Hear Music outlets in Starbucks coffee shops on 10 November 2005; the sales campaign pledged to donate two dollars from every sale to the Elton John AIDS Foundation. The following year, on 10 October 2006, the album was re-released to the general market; however, six songs were omitted from the new release.

The Pet Shop Boys song "It Doesn't Often Snow at Christmas" was originally released in 1997 to members of their fan club, and was not available anywhere else prior to this release.

Original track listing
 "Step into Christmas" – Elton John
 "Feliz Navidad" – El Vez
 "Frosty the Snowman" – The Ronettes
 "Santa Claus Is Comin' to Town" – Bruce Springsteen
 "The Man with All the Toys" – The Beach Boys
 "A Change at Christmas (Say It Isn't So)" – The Flaming Lips
 "It Doesn't Often Snow at Christmas" – Pet Shop Boys
 "Spotlight on Christmas" – Rufus Wainwright
 "Jingle Bell Rock" – The Ventures
 "Run Rudolph Run" – Chuck Berry
 "Rudolph the Red-Nosed Reindeer" – The Crystals
 "Playa's Ball" – OutKast
 "Merry Christmas Baby" – Otis Redding
 "Christmas Island" – Jimmy Buffett
 "St. Patrick's Day" – John Mayer
 "Please Come Home for Christmas" – Eagles
 "Christmas Must Be Tonight" – The Band
 "2000 Miles" – The Pretenders
 "December Will Be Magic Again" – Kate Bush
 "New Year's Day" – U2
 "Calling It Christmas" – Elton John and Joss Stone

2006 track listing
 "Step into Christmas" – Elton John
 "Feliz Navidad" – El Vez
 "The Man with All the Toys" – The Beach Boys
 "A Change at Christmas (Say It Isn't So)" – The Flaming Lips
 "It Doesn't Often Snow at Christmas" – Pet Shop Boys
 "Spotlight on Christmas" – Rufus Wainwright
 "Jingle Bell Rock" – The Ventures
 "Run Rudolph Run" – Chuck Berry
 "Merry Christmas Baby" – Otis Redding
 "Christmas Island" – Jimmy Buffett
 "Christmas Must Be Tonight" – The Band
 "2000 Miles" – The Pretenders
 "December Will Be Magic Again" – Kate Bush
 "New Year's Day" – U2
 "Calling It Christmas" – Elton John and Joss Stone

References

Elton John compilation albums
Christmas compilation albums
2005 Christmas albums
Christmas albums by English artists
Hear Music compilation albums
Pop rock Christmas albums
2005 compilation albums